Fiona Neill is a British author and journalist. She has written five Sunday Times bestsellers including Her last novel,
The Betrayals which sold over 130,000 copies and was a Richard & Judy Book Club selection. She has worked
as a foreign correspondent in Central America, was assistant editor for Marie Claire and The Times
Magazine, and written for numerous publications including the Sunday Times and the Telegraph, as well as having
written a screenplay of her first novel for the British Film Institute.

Bibliography

External links

References

English columnists
Year of birth missing (living people)
Living people
English women novelists
English women non-fiction writers
British women columnists